Gallowglass is a 1990 novel by British writer Ruth Rendell, written under the name Barbara Vine.

Plot summary

Sandor comes from a wealthy home and is highly educated. Joe, longing for a friend, falls under his spell.

Some years earlier, Sandor had taken part in the kidnapping of a former model, Nina. He now plans to kidnap her again so that they can live together. At present, Nina lives in a heavily guarded residence with her husband and many servants. Eventually, Joe's colourful stepsister, Tilly, is also dragged into the plot. However, things don't turn out as Sandor had planned. Most of the story is seen through Joe's eyes, but Paul Garnet, Nina's driver, also tells part of the tale.

Adaptation
The novel was adapted by the BBC as part of The Barbara Vine Mysteries. Jacqueline Holborough wrote the screenplay for this version.

1990 British novels
Novels by Ruth Rendell
Works published under a pseudonym
Novels set in London
Viking Press books
British novels adapted into television shows
Harmony Books books